Impromptu is a 1932 British comedy short by William C. McGann, starring Richard Bird, Florence Desmond and Dodo Watts.

External links
 Impromptu on imdb.com

1932 films
1932 comedy films
1932 short films
British black-and-white films
British comedy short films
Films directed by William C. McGann
1930s English-language films
1930s British films
English-language comedy films